Elections to the French National Assembly were held in Chad and Ubangi-Shari on 17 June 1951. The territories elected four seats to the Assembly via two electoral colleges; the first college spanned both territories and elected one seat, whilst Chad elected two seats via the second college and Ubangi-Shari one. René Malbrant was re-elected from the first college, and Barthélémy Boganda from the second in Ubangi-Shari. In the second college in Chad, both seats were won by the Chadian Democratic Union.

Results

First college

Second college

Chad

Ubangi-Shari

References

Chad
Elections in the Central African Republic
1951 in Ubangi-Shari
Chad
Elections in Chad
1951 in Chad
June 1951 events in Africa